A revolute joint (also called pin joint or hinge joint) is a one-degree-of-freedom kinematic pair used frequently in mechanisms and machines.  The joint constrains the motion of two bodies to pure rotation along a common axis. The joint does not allow translation, or sliding linear motion, a constraint not shown in the diagram. Almost all assemblies of multiple moving bodies include revolute joints in their designs. Revolute joints are used in numerous applications such as door hinges, mechanisms, and other uni-axial rotation devices. 

A revolute joint is usually made by a pin or knuckle joint, through a rotary bearing. It enforces a cylindrical contact area, which makes it a lower kinematic pair, also called a full joint. However, If there is any clearance between the pin and hole (as there must be for motion), so-called surface contact in the pin joint actually becomes line contact. 

The contact between the inner and outer cylindrical surfaces is usually assumed to be frictionless. Some more complex models take stiction and stribeck effect into consideration.

See also

 Cylindrical joint
 Kinematics
 Degrees of freedom (mechanics)
 Kinematic pair
 Mechanical joint
 Prismatic joint

References 

Kinematics
Rigid bodies